Ibrahim Abdel Hamidu Sharli (1907–2003) was an Egyptian football defender who played for Egypt in the 1934 FIFA World Cup. He also played for Al-Olympi Alexandria.

References

Egyptian footballers
Egypt international footballers
Association football defenders
1934 FIFA World Cup players
1907 births
2003 deaths